Emiliano Buale (born 8 December 1969) is an Equatoguinean middle-distance runner. He competed in the men's 800 metres at the 1992 Summer Olympics.

References

1969 births
Living people
Athletes (track and field) at the 1992 Summer Olympics
Equatoguinean male middle-distance runners
Olympic athletes of Equatorial Guinea
Place of birth missing (living people)